Twilight Theater is the fourth studio album by the Finnish rock band Poets of the Fall. It was released in Finland as well as on iTunes on 17 March 2010 and was released in Germany, Austria and Switzerland on 29 October. The record went gold in its first week after jumping to #1 on the Finnish album charts. 

The title of the album comes from the song "Given and Denied".

The song "War" was featured in 2010 video game Alan Wake and released as part of Steam Collector's Edition soundtrack on 2 March 2012. It was released as a single on February, 16th.

Track listing

Release history

Singles

Trivia
The track War is featured in the video game Alan Wake
The track 15 Minute Flame was partly inspired by the movie The Sixth Sense starring Bruce Willis
The album is the first the band considers to feature "cinematic rock" instead of "alternative rock" on the previous three albums
The harlequin on the cover is based on a photo showing the band's vocalist Marko Saaresto
The ticket on the album-cover contains the original release date of the album as well as a sequence of numbers that translates into Hamartia

References

2010 albums
Poets of the Fall albums